SpiderBabe is a 2003 American made for cable erotic superhero film. It is loosely based on the character Spider-Man created by Stan Lee and published by Marvel Comics. The film was written by John Fedele and Terry West, and directed by Johnny Crash. Erin Brown, better known within the genre as Misty Mundae, stars as the title character.

Plot
Patricia Porker is a shy New Jersey high school girl whose life is changed forever when she is bitten by a genetically-engineered spider and turns into a wall-climbing beauty with superhuman strength. Calling herself SpiderBabe, she uses her newfound powers to enter a wrestling contest and win enough money to move out of her Uncle Flem and Aunt Maybe's home and into her own apartment with best friend Lisa Knoxx. However, a robber murders Uncle Flem and inspires Patricia to use her newfound powers to battle crime in New York City, while she also tries to tell her best friend Mark Wetson that she wants to be his girlfriend and has copious amounts of lesbian sex. Meanwhile, Lisa's ambitious sister, Lucinda Knoxx, uses the same genetic engineering techniques that Patricia's science teacher, Dr. Dowell, had used on a spider on herself, and gains a villainous alter-ego, the sexy and evil genius Femtilian. Femtilian sets out on a quest for world domination that can only be resolved in a head-to-head showdown with SpiderBabe.

Cast
Misty Mundae - Patricia Porker/SpiderBabe
Julian Wells - Lucinda Knox/Femtilian
Darian Caine - Lisa Knox
Shelby Taylor - Queen Bee
Michael R. Thomas - Dr. Dowell
Joe Hoban - Nutsuck

References

External links

2003 television films
2003 films
American erotic films
American superhero films
Parodies of Spider-Man
2000s American films
2000s English-language films
Unofficial Spider-Man films